
Gmina Lisia Góra is a rural gmina (administrative district) in Tarnów County, Lesser Poland Voivodeship, in southern Poland.

Villages
Gmina Lisia Góra contains the villages and settlements of Breń, Brzozówka, Kobierzyn, Lisia Góra, Łukowa, Nowa Jastrząbka, Nowe Żukowice, Pawęzów, Śmigno and Stare Żukowice.

Neighbouring gminas
Gmina Lisia Góra is bordered by the city of Tarnów and by the gminas of Czarna, Dąbrowa Tarnowska, Radgoszcz, Tarnów and Żabno.

References
Polish official population figures 2006

Lisia Gora
Tarnów County